Captain John Todd  (1899–1980) was a Scottish First World War flying ace credited with 18 aerial victories.

Military service
Todd was a medical student at the University of Edinburgh before he joined the Royal Flying Corps as a cadet. He was commissioned as a temporary second lieutenant (on probation) on the General List on 2 August 1917, and was confirmed in his rank on 3 November.

He was posted to No. 70 Squadron RFC to fly the Sopwith Camel single-seat fighter, and scored his first victory on 22 January 1918. Further victories followed, and Todd had brought his score up to five by the end of March, to make him an ace. On 1 April 1918, the Royal Flying Corps was merged with the Royal Naval Air Service to form the Royal Air Force, and his unit became No. 70 Squadron RAF. He gained three more victories by the end of the month, and on 7 May he was appointed a flight commander with the acting rank of captain. As such he gained six more victories in May, three in June, and his 18th and last on 1 July 1918. His final total was ten enemy aircraft destroyed (two shared), seven driven down out of control (one shared), and one captured. Fourteen of them were fighters and four were reconnaissance aircraft.

Todd was posted back to the Home Establishment in Britain to serve as an instructor in July 1918. On 3 August his award of the Distinguished Flying Cross was gazetted, followed by his Military Cross on 16 September. On 5 January 1919 he was transferred to the RAF's unemployed list.

A replica of the F.1 Sopwith Camel B7320 flown by Todd is on permanent display at Montrose Air Station Heritage Centre in Montrose, Angus

List of aerial victories

Post-war career
After the war Todd returned to his medical studies. After graduating in 1922, he went to Livingstonia, Nyasaland, as a medical missionary. His work was rewarded by being made a Member of the Order of the British Empire in the 1955 Birthday Honours "for medical and missionary services in Northern Rhodesia."

Awards and citations
Distinguished Flying Cross
Lieutenant (Temporary Captain) John Todd, MC. (formerly No. 70 Squadron).
"With four other officers he engaged ten enemy scouts, shooting down one; later, on the same day, he shot down another in flames. In addition to these, during the last two months he has shot down seven enemy machines. His gallantry in leading his flight into action against enemy patrols of superior numbers has been an inspiring example.
 
Military Cross
Second Lieutenant (Temporary Captain) John Todd, R.A.F.
"For conspicuous gallantry and devotion to duty. During recent operations he destroyed three enemy aircraft, forced one to land in our lines, and drove four down out of control. He did very fine work."

References

Bibliography 

 

1899 births
1980 deaths
People from Falkirk
Alumni of the University of Edinburgh
Royal Flying Corps officers
Royal Air Force personnel of World War I
British World War I flying aces
Scottish flying aces
Recipients of the Distinguished Flying Cross (United Kingdom)
Recipients of the Military Cross
Medical missionaries
Members of the Order of the British Empire
Nyasaland people